Phytolaccaceae is a family of flowering plants. Though almost universally recognized by taxonomists, its circumscription has varied. It is also known as the Pokeweed family.

The APG II system, of 2003 (unchanged from the APG system, of 1998), also recognizes this family and assigns it to the order Caryophyllales in the clade core eudicots. The family comprises five genera, totalling 33 known species. It is divided into the subfamilies Agdestioideae and Phytolaccoideae, with the former Rivinioideae in the Takhtajan system, now placed in its own family Petiveriaceae

Genera and species 
The Phytolaccaceae includes the following genera:
Agdestis Moc. & Sessé ex DC. — 1 species
Anisomeria D.Don — 3 species
Ercilla A.Juss. — 2 species
Nowickea J.Martínez & J.A.McDonald — 2 species
Phytolacca L. — ca 25 species

Former genera 

The following genera were previously included in the Phytolaccaceae:

Achatocarpus Triana → Achatocarpaceae
Barbeuia Thouars → Barbeuiaceae
Gallesia Casar. → Petiveriaceae
Gisekia L. → Gisekiaceae
Hilleria Vell. → Petiveriaceae
Gyrostemon Desf. → Gyrostemonaceae
Ledenbergia Klotzsch ex Moq. → Petiveriaceae
Lophiocarpus Turcz. → Lophiocarpaceae
Microtea Sw. → Microteaceae
Monococcus F.Muell. → Petiveriaceae
Petiveria L. → Petiveriaceae
Phaulothamnus A.Gray → Achatocarpaceae
Rivina L. → Petiveriaceae
Schindleria H.Walter → Petiveriaceae
Seguieria Loefl. → Petiveriaceae
Stegnosperma Benth. → Stegnospermataceae
Trichostigma A.Rich. → Petiveriaceae

References

External links

 Phytolaccaceae in L. Watson and M.J. Dallwitz (1992 onwards). The families of flowering plants: descriptions, illustrations, identification, information retrieval. Version: 30 May 2006. http://delta-intkey.com
 Phytolaccaeae in the Flora of North America
 Phytolaccaeae in the Flora of China
 NCBI Taxonomy Browser
  Pictures of representative species

 
Caryophyllales families